Brevard Memorial Stadium is a 7,000-seat football stadium located in Brevard, North Carolina. The stadium is the home field of the Brevard High School Blue Devils and the Brevard College Tornados. The Tornados compete in the National Collegiate Athletic Association (NCAA) Division II South Atlantic Conference (SAC). The school installed an artificial turf field in 2014.

References

External links
Brevard Tornados football

Athletics (track and field) venues in North Carolina
Brevard Tornados football
Buildings and structures in Transylvania County, North Carolina
College football venues
Sports venues in North Carolina
High school football venues in the United States
American football venues in North Carolina